Berosus infuscatus is a species of hydrophilid beetle from the United States, Mexico and Cuba.

References

Hydrophilinae
Beetles described in 1855